This is a complete list of the operas by the Italian composer Ottorino Respighi (1879–1936).

See also
 List of compositions by Ottorino Respighi

Sources
 
 
 

Lists of operas by composer
 
Lists of compositions by composer